The Treaty of Hartford is a treaty concluded between New York and Massachusetts on December 16, 1786 in Hartford, Connecticut.

Background 
The colonial charters for New York and Massachusetts both described their boundaries as extending westward to the Pacific Ocean.

However, both charters used distances from coastal rivers as their baselines, and thus both states could claim the same land. The area in dispute included all of western New York State west of, approximately, Seneca Lake, extending all the way to the Niagara River and Lake Erie, and north to south from the shore of Lake Ontario to the Pennsylvania border.

Terms 
New York and Massachusetts agreed to divide the rights in question with a treaty signed December 16. The states agreed that all of the land in question, about 6 million acres (24,000 km2), would be recognized as part of New York State. Massachusetts, in return, obtained the right of preemption, the title to all of the land, giving it the exclusive right to extinguish by purchase the possessory rights of the Indian tribes (except for a narrow strip along the Niagara River, the title to which was recognized to belong to New York). The compact also provided that Massachusetts could sell or assign its preemptive rights.

Aftermath 
In 1788 Massachusetts sold its rights to the entire six million acres (24,000 km2) to Oliver Phelps and Nathaniel Gorham for $1,000,000, payable in specie or in certain Massachusetts securities then trading at about 20 cents on the dollar, the money used to repay some of the state's debt from the Revolutionary War.  Similar western boundary issues involving these and other states were resolved by the Northwest Ordinance passed by the Congress of the Confederation in July 1787.

See also 
Phelps and Gorham Purchase
Holland Land Company
The Holland Purchase
The Morris Reserve
The Pulteney Association

History of Hartford, Connecticut
Hartford
Hartford
1786 in Connecticut